Selter may refer to:

Selter (hills), a ridge of Lower Saxony, Germany

People with the surname
Jen Selter (born 1993), American model
Karl Selter (1898–1958), Estonian politician

See also
Selters (disambiguation)